St. Joseph's Roman Catholic Church is a former parish church of the Archdiocese of Dubuque located in Stone City, Iowa, United States.  Catholics in Stone City were initially served by priests from Cedar Rapids and Anamosa.  Mass was celebrated in parishioner's homes until 1881 when permission was granted to use a large hall in Stone City.  The parish was established in 1901 and the cornerstone for the church building was laid in 1913.  It was completed later the same year. The church was designed by Dubuque, Iowa architect Guido Beck. The stained glass windows of the church were imported from Germany. The limestone used for the building was donated by city quarries. Otto Braun served as the contractor, and the labor to construct the church was also donated by local quarry businesses.  The lower level of the building houses the parish hall.  The rear of the church can be seen anchoring the left side of Grant Wood's painting Stone City (1930).  The parish started to lose parishioners in the 1920s when the stone quarries started to decline.  Its size increased again in the 1950s before economic factors once again caused it to decline.  The archdiocese closed the parish in 1992, and church building became an oratory.

The church building was individually listed on the National Register of Historic Places in 2005.  It was included as a contributing property in the Stone City Historic District in 2008.

See also
 Saint Joseph

References

Christian organizations established in 1901
Roman Catholic churches completed in 1913
Buildings and structures in Jones County, Iowa
Gothic Revival church buildings in Iowa
Limestone churches in the United States
Churches on the National Register of Historic Places in Iowa
St. Joseph
National Register of Historic Places in Jones County, Iowa
Individually listed contributing properties to historic districts on the National Register in Iowa
20th-century Roman Catholic church buildings in the United States